The USSR State Prize was the Soviet Union's state honor. It was established on 9 September 1966. After the dissolution of the Soviet Union, the prize was followed up by the State Prize of the Russian Federation.

The State Stalin Prize (Государственная Сталинская премия, Gosudarstvennaya Stalinskaya premiya), usually called the Stalin Prize, existed from 1941 to 1954, although some sources give a termination date of 1952. It essentially played the same role; therefore upon the establishment of the USSR State Prize, the diplomas and badges of the recipients of Stalin Prize were changed to that of USSR State Prize.

In 1944 and 1945, the last two years of the Second World War, the award ceremonies for the Stalin Prize were not held. Instead, in 1946 the ceremony was held twice: in January for the works created in 1943–1944 and in June for the works of 1945.

USSR State Prize of 1st, 2nd and 3rd degrees was awarded annually to individuals in the fields of science, mathematics, literature, arts, and architecture to honor the most prominent achievements which either advanced the Soviet Union or the cause of socialism. Often the prize was awarded to specific works rather than to individuals.

Each constituent Soviet republic (SSR) and autonomous republic (ASSR) also had a State Prize (or Stalin Prize).

The Stalin Prize was an honor different from the Stalin Peace Prize. The latter was created on 21 December 1949 and was usually awarded to foreign recipients rather than to Soviet citizens.

It should also not be confused with the Lenin Prize.

References

See also
List of recipients of the USSR State Prize
List of recipients of the Stalin Prize

Civil awards and decorations of the Soviet Union
Awards established in 1966
Awards disestablished in 1991
1966 establishments in the Soviet Union
1991 disestablishments in the Soviet Union
Recipients of the USSR State Prize